Tiffany glass refers to the many and varied types of glass developed and produced from 1878 to 1933 at the Tiffany Studios in New York City, by Louis Comfort Tiffany and a team of other designers, including Clara Driscoll, Agnes F. Northrop, and Frederick Wilson.

In 1865, Tiffany traveled to Europe, and in London he visited the Victoria and Albert Museum, whose extensive collection of Roman and Syrian glass made a deep impression on him. He admired the coloration of medieval glass and was convinced that the quality of contemporary glass could be improved upon. In his own words, the "Rich tones are due in part to the use of pot metal full of impurities, and in part to the uneven thickness of the glass, but still more because the glass maker of that day abstained from the use of paint".

Tiffany was an interior designer, and in 1878 his interest turned toward the creation of stained glass, when he opened his own studio and glass foundry because he was unable to find the types of glass that he desired in interior decoration. His inventiveness both as a designer of windows and as a producer of the material with which to create them was to become renowned.  Tiffany wanted the glass itself to transmit texture and rich colors and he developed a type of glass he called "Favrile".

The glass was manufactured at the Tiffany factory located at 96-18 43rd Avenue in the Corona section of Queens from 1901 to 1932.

Types

Opalescent glass

 

The term "opalescent glass" is commonly used to describe glass where more than one color is present, being fused during the manufacture, as against flashed glass in which two colors may be laminated, or silver stained glass where a solution of silver nitrate is superficially applied, turning red glass to orange and blue glass to green. Some opalescent glass was used by several stained glass studios in England from the 1860s and 1870s onwards, notably Heaton, Butler and Bayne. Its use became increasingly common. Opalescent glass is the basis for the range of glasses created by Tiffany.

Favrile glass

Tiffany patented Favrile glass in 1892. Favrile glass often has a distinctive characteristic that is common in some glass from Classical antiquity: it possesses a superficial iridescence. This iridescence causes the surface to shimmer, but also causes a degree of opacity. This iridescent effect of the glass was obtained by mixing different colors of glass together while hot.

According to Tiffany:

Streamer glass

Streamer glass refers to a sheet of glass with a pattern of glass strings affixed to its surface.  Tiffany made use of such textured glass to represent, for example, twigs, branches and grass.

Streamers are prepared from very hot molten glass, gathered at the end of a punty (pontil) that is rapidly swung back and forth and stretched into long, thin strings that rapidly cool and harden.   These hand-stretched streamers are pressed on the molten surface of sheet glass during the rolling process, and become permanently fused.

Fracture glass

Fracture glass refers to a sheet of glass with a pattern of irregularly shaped, thin glass wafers affixed to its surface.  Tiffany made use of such textured glass to represent, for example, foliage seen from a distance.

The irregular glass wafers, called fractures, are prepared from very hot, colored molten glass, gathered at the end of a blowpipe. A large bubble is forcefully blown until the walls of the bubble rapidly stretch, cool and harden.  The resulting glass bubble has paper-thin walls and is immediately shattered into shards.  These hand blown shards are pressed on the surface of the molten glass sheet during the rolling process, to which they become permanently fused.

Fracture-streamer glass

Fracture-streamer glass refers to a sheet of glass with a pattern of glass strings, and irregularly shaped, thin glass wafers, affixed to its surface.  Tiffany made use of such textured glass to represent, for example, twigs, branches and grass, and distant foliage.

The process is as above except that both streamers and fractures are applied to sheet glass during the rolling process.

Ring mottle glass

Ring mottle glass refers to sheet glass with a pronounced mottle created by localized, heat-treated opacification and crystal-growth dynamics. Ring mottle glass was invented by Tiffany in the early 20th century. Tiffany's distinctive style exploited glass containing a variety of motifs such as those found in ring mottle glass, and he relied minimally on painted details.

When Tiffany Studio closed in 1928, the secret formula for making ring mottle glass was forgotten and lost. Ring mottle glass was re-discovered in the late sixties by Eric Lovell of Uroboros Glass. Traditionally used for organic details on leaves and other natural elements, ring mottles also find a place in contemporary work when abstract patterns are desired.

Ripple glass

Ripple glass refers to textured glass with marked surface waves. Tiffany made use of such textured glass to represent, for example, water or leaf veins.

The texture is created during the glass sheet-forming process. A sheet is formed from molten glass with a roller that spins on itself while travelling forward.  Normally the roller spins at the same speed as its own forward motion, much like a steam roller flattening tarmac, and the resulting sheet has a smooth surface. In the manufacture of rippled glass, the roller spins faster than its own forward motion. The rippled effect is retained as the glass cools.

Drapery glass

Drapery glass refers to a sheet of heavily folded glass that suggests fabric folds.  Tiffany made abundant use of drapery glass in ecclesiastical stained glass windows to add a 3-dimensional effect to flowing robes and angel wings, and to imitate the natural coarseness of magnolia petals.

The making of drapery glass requires skill and experience. A small diameter hand-held roller is manipulated forcefully over a sheet of molten glass to produce heavy ripples, while folding and creasing the entire sheet. The ripples become rigid and permanent as the glass cools. Each sheet produced from this artisanal process is unique.

Cutting techniques
In order to cut streamer, fracture or ripple glass, the sheet may be scored on the side without streamers, fractures or ripples with a carbide glass cutter, and broken at the score line with breaker-grozier pliers.

In order to cut drapery glass, the sheet may be placed on styrofoam, scored with a carbide glass cutter, and broken at the score line with breaker-grozier pliers, but a bandsaw or ringsaw are the preferred.

Locations and collections

Stained glass in situ

Canada
Ontario
London – St Paul's Cathedral, four windows, two signed by Tiffany
Quebec
Montreal – Montreal Museum of Fine Arts, Bourgie Pavilion (formerly Erskine and American United Church), twenty windows signed by Tiffany  
Mexico
Mexico City – Palacio de Bellas Artes
 United States
Alabama 
Mobile – Christ Church Cathedral 

Arizona
 Douglas – Gadsden Hotel
California
Mare Island, Vallejo – St. Peter's Chapel
Colorado
Colorado Springs – First United Methodist Church
Connecticut
New Haven –
Center Church on the Green
Trinity Lutheran Church
Florida
St. Augustine – Flagler College
Georgia
Atlanta – All Saints' Episcopal Church
Jekyll Island  – Faith Chapel
Macon – St. Paul's Episcopal Church
Savannah – Gryphon Tea Room
Thomasville – St. Thomas Episcopal Church 
Illinois
Chicago –
Macy's on State Street, formerly Marshall Field's
Second Presbyterian Church on South Michigan Avenue
Springfield – First Presbyterian Church

Indiana
Indianapolis – Second Presbyterian Church
Iowa
Dubuque – St. Luke's United Methodist Church
Kansas
Topeka – First Presbyterian Church
Kentucky
Covington – Trinity Episcopal Church
Louisiana
New Orleans – Tulane University
Maine
Portland – Masonic Temple
Maryland
Baltimore – Brown Memorial Presbyterian Church
Massachusetts
Boston –
Arlington Street Church
Church of the Covenant
Wellesley – Houghton Memorial Chapel at Wellesley College
Nantucket – St. Pauls Episcopal Church
Michigan
Ann Arbor – 
Unitarian Universalist Church (Hobbs & Black)
Newberry Hall (Kelsey Museum of Archeology) 
Grand Rapids – 
 Ladies Literary Club
Temple Emanuel
Marquette –
 The Resurrection Window, Morgan Chapel, St. Paul's Episcopal Church
Missouri
Kansas City – St. Mary's Episcopal Church
Kirkwood – Grace Episcopal Church
New Hampshire
Bretton Woods – Mount Washington Hotel
New Jersey
Hackensack – Second Reformed Church
Maplewood – Morrow Memorial United Methodist Church
New Brunswick – Kirkpatrick Chapel at Rutgers, The State University of New Jersey
New York
Albany – First Presbyterian Church of Albany
Albion – Pullman Memorial Universalist Church
Auburn – Willard Chapel
Beacon – St. Andrew's Church 
Briarcliff Manor – Congregational Church
Buffalo – St. Paul's Episcopal Cathedral 
Irvington –
Irvington Presbyterian Church
 Irvington Town Hall – Clock face and reading room
Lockport – First Presbyterian Church
New York City –
Brooklyn – 
Brown Memorial Baptist Church and church house
Flatbush Reformed Church and church house
First Unitarian Congregational Society and Rev. Donald McKinney chapel
Manhattan –
Grand Central Terminal –  clock face on south facade
West End Collegiate Church, West End Avenue
St. Michael's Church, New York City, Amsterdam Avenue at 99th Street
Holy Trinity Lutheran Church
Roslyn – Trinity Episcopal Church
Roxbury – Jay Gould Memorial Reformed Church
Saugerties – St. Mary of the Snow, 36 Cedar Street
Troy – Troy Public Library
Tuxedo Park – St. Mary's-in-Tuxedo Episcopal Church
 Garden City – St Paul's School, endangered glass
Washingtonville – Moffat Library
 Ohio
 Cleveland – Wade Memorial Chapel in Lake View Cemetery
 Dayton – 
 Westminster Presbyterian Church, 125 N. Wilkinson Street
 Historic Woodland Cemetery & Arboretum, 118 Woodland Avenue
 Pennsylvania
Altoona – St. Lukes Episcopal Church
Brownsville – Christ Episcopal Church
Erie –
Cathedral of St. Paul
First Presbyterian Church
Franklin – St. John's Episcopal Church
Kittanning – Grace Presbyterian Church
Lancaster – First Presbyterian Church
Lewistown –
St. Mark's Episcopal Church
First United Methodist Church
 Montgomery Township – Robert Kennedy Memorial Presbyterian Church
New Castle – St. Jude's Episcopal Church, formerly known as Trinity Episcopal Church
 Philadelphia – 
Calvary Center for Culture and Community
Church of the Holy Trinity
First Presbyterian Church
St. Stephen's Episcopal Church
Tenth Presbyterian Church
 Pittsburgh – 
Calvary United Methodist Church
Emmanuel Episcopal Church
Shadyside Presbyterian Church
First Presbyterian Church
Third Presbyterian Church
St. Andrews Episcopal Church
Sewickley –
First Presbyterian Church
St. Stephen's Episcopal Church
Sharon – Buhl Mausoleum
Titusville - St. James Memorial Episcopal Church
Uniontown –
Trinity United Presbyterian Church
St. Peter's Episcopal Church
Whitemarsh Township – St. Thomas' Church
Williamsport – Christ Community Worship Center, formerly the Presbyterian Church of the Covenant
 Tennessee
 Chattanooga – Saints Peter and Paul Basilica
 Memphis – Grace-St. Luke's Episcopal Church
 Texas
 Galveston – Trinity Episcopal Church
 Utah
 Salt Lake City – 
Salt Lake Temple
St. Mark's Episcopal Cathedral
 Vermont
 St. Johnsbury – Grace United Methodist Church
 Virginia
Newport News – St. Paul's Episcopal Church
Norfolk – St. Paul's Episcopal Church
Richmond – Congregation Beth Ahabah
Petersburg – Blandford Church
Staunton – Trinity Episcopal Church
 Washington
 Seattle – Pierre P. Ferry House
 Wisconsin
 Menomonie – Mabel Tainter Memorial Building
 Milwaukee – St. Paul's Episcopal Church
 Oshkosh – Oshkosh Public Museum

Museums
United Kingdom
 England
 Haworth Art Gallery, Accrington
United States
Florida
Charles Hosmer Morse Museum of American Art, Winter Park
Illinois
Art Institute of Chicago, Chicago
Halim Time and Glass Museum, Evanston
Louisiana
Newcomb Art Museum, Tulane University, New Orleans
Michigan
University of Michigan Museum of Art, Ann Arbor
New York
Brooklyn Museum, Brooklyn, New York City
Metropolitan Museum of Art, Manhattan, New York City
Neustadt Collection of Tiffany Glass, Queens Museum, Queens, New York City
New-York Historical Society, Manhattan, New York City 
Texas
Dallas Museum of Art, Dallas
Virginia
Virginia Museum of Fine Arts, Richmond

See also 
Tiffany lamp
Stained glass

References 
Informational notes

Citations

Further reading

External links

Publications and ephemeral materials from Tiffany Studios, Tiffany Glass & Decorating Company, Tiffany and Company, and the Louis Comfort Tiffany Foundation – held by the Metropolitan Museum of Art

Architectural elements
Glass types
Glass art
Glass trademarks and brands
Stained glass
Tiffany Studios
Corona, Queens